is a Japanese manga series written and illustrated by Kaoru Fukaya. Originally published on the author's Twitter account in October 2015, the series was initially acquired by Enterbrain, who published the first tankōbon volume in June 2016, and later by Kodansha who re-released the volume and continued its publication. As of November 2022, the series has been collected into nine volumes. An anime television series adaptation by Shogakukan Music & Digital Entertainment premiered in March 2023.

The manga won the Short Story Award at the 21st Tezuka Osamu Cultural Prize.

Characters

Media

Manga
It was later serialized on Kadokawa's ComicWalker website from February 22, 2016, to July 12, 2016. Enterbrain initially published the first tankōbon volume on June 30, 2016. Kodansha released a new edition of the first volume on March 23, 2017, and continued publishing subsequent volumes. The manga continued its serialization on Kodansha's Moae manga platform on the same day, until October 14, 2022. It moved to the blog of the Comic Days platform's editorial department on October 17, 2022. As of November 2022, nine volumes have been released.

Volume list

Anime
An anime television series adaptation was announced on November 22, 2022. It is produced by Shogakukan Music & Digital Entertainment and directed by Kazuma Taketani, with scripts written by Hiroko Kanasugi, and music composed by Kenichi Maeyamada. The series consists of 15 episodes, with the first five episodes premiering on March 21, 2023; episodes 6–10 on March 24; 11–12 on March 26; and 13–15 on March 27, 2023, on NHK General TV. A cover version of Kiyoshiro Imawano's "Jump" will serve as the theme song.

Reception
As of November 2022, Yomawari Neko has sold over 630,000 copies.

The series was nominated in the manga category at the 2017 Sugoi Japan Awards. It also ranked 25th on the 2016 "Book of the Year" list by Da Vinci magazine. In 2017, the manga won the Short Story Award at the 21st Tezuka Osamu Cultural Prize.

References

External links
  
 

Anime series based on manga
Comics about cats
Enterbrain manga
Japanese webcomics
Kodansha manga
NHK original programming
Seinen manga
Webcomics in print
Winner of Tezuka Osamu Cultural Prize (Short Story Award)